Ondřej Zdráhala (born 10 July 1983) is a Czech handball player for Wisła Płock and the Czech national team.

He participated at the 2015 World Men's Handball Championship in Qatar. He was the top goalscorer at the 2018 European Men's Handball Championship.

References

External links

1983 births
Living people
Sportspeople from Ostrava
Czech male handball players
Expatriate handball players in Poland
Czech expatriate sportspeople in Germany
Czech expatriate sportspeople in Norway
Czech expatriate sportspeople in Poland
Czech expatriate sportspeople in Switzerland
Handball-Bundesliga players
Wisła Płock (handball) players